Logan Gray (born 23 June 1986) is a Scottish former curler. He is a two-time World Junior curling bronze medallist. He is the brother of curler Lauren Gray.

Gray was educated at Balfron High School, where he became Scottish Schools Curling Champion in 2001, and the University of Stirling, where he graduated with a BA in Accounting and Finance in 2006.

Gray has participated at numerous Scottish national championships. He has one World Curling Tour title from the Mercure Perth Masters in 2014. He retired from international competition in June 2014.

Gray was ice development officer at Active Stirling from June 2006 to May 2015. He was appointed as strategic relationship manager at British Blind Sport in September 2016. He also works as a commentator for the World Curling Federation's television arm and commentates on broadcasts of international tournaments.

References

External links
 
 

1986 births
Living people
Scottish male curlers
Alumni of the University of Stirling